The 1949 Temple Owls football team was an American football team that represented Temple University as an independent during the 1949 college football season. In its first season under head coach Albert Kawal, the team compiled a 5–4 record and was outscored by a total of 225 to 156. The team played its home games at Temple Stadium in Philadelphia.

Schedule

References

Temple
Temple Owls football seasons
Temple Owls football